Duniya Meri Jeb Mein is a 1979 Indian Hindi-language action film directed by Tinnu Anand, stars Shashi Kapoor, Rishi Kapoor, Neetu Singh in pivotal roles and music was composed by Rajesh Roshan.

Plot
Vishal Khanna (Rishi Kapoor), a student in a prestigious college, believes he lives a wealthy lifestyle along with his brother, Karan Khanna (Shashi Kapoor), a businessman. Vishal meets and falls in love with Neeta (Neetu Singh), the only daughter of wealthy widower, Gulabchand. Gulabchand meets with Karan and both finalize Vishal and Neeta's marriage. Then things spiral out of control when Gulabchand is killed while Karan is run over by a lorry and ends up losing both his legs. Vishal undertakes to look after the now crippled Karan, but has more surprises to face when Police Inspector Yadav informs him that Karan was never a businessman, but a trapeze artiste in Amar Circus and is also a suspect of a daring robbery and the murder of Gulabchand.

Cast
Shashi Kapoor as Karan Khanna 
Rishi Kapoor as Vishal Khanna 
Neetu Singh as Neeta 
Ranjeet as Rawat
Agha as Diwanchand 
Raj Mehra as Gulabchand 
Pinchoo Kapoor as Thakurdas
Nadira as Mrs. Robins 
Paintal as Bhaskar 
Lalita Pawar as Supervisor (Girls Hostel) 
Jagdish Raj as Supervisor (Boys Hostel) 
Keshto Mukherjee as Watchman (Boys Hostel) 
Sudhir as Inspector Yadav 
Helen as Bar Dancer

Soundtrack
Lyricist: Gulshan Bawra

External links
 

1979 films
1970s Hindi-language films
1979 action films
Films scored by Rajesh Roshan
Indian action films
Hindi-language action films